(Institute of Stock Exchange Studies, often referred to as the IEB) is a higher education institution founded in 1989 in Madrid, Spain. It is a pioneer center in Spain in teaching Financial Economics and an official provider for many international designations, such as CFM, CFA and CAIA.

The institute is affiliated to the Complutense University of Madrid and is sponsored by the Madrid Stock Exchange. 

The IEB began its international career in 2003, with the alliance with the London School of Economics, a world reference institution. The LSE has 20 Nobel Prize winners and students from the 5 continents. Since then, Fordham University, The Chinese University of Hong Kong, Wharton University and Bayes Business School have joined this international development. 

With the creation of the In Company training area at the end of the 90's, IEB's educational offer was significantly expanded. The University affiliations and Spanish and international corporate partners of global importance stand out. The IEB, since its inception, has devoted considerable resources to research, with several Observatories. Among the numerous research publications of the IEB is AESTIMATIO, The IEB International Journal of Finance, with the participation of two Nobel Prize, Harry Markowitz. 

Today, the IEB offers nearly 100 educational programs, covering a solid academic training in Undergraduate and Masters, from MBAs to the most specialized in various financial and legal areas, a wide range of Executive Education courses and an important Summer School.

History

 In 1989 IEB was founded, a center attached to the Complutense University of Madrid and from the beginning sponsored by the Madrid Stock Exchange, specialized in financial and legal education. 
 Since 2003 it began its international programs and alliances thanks to an agreement with the London School of Economics, a prestigious international university with 20 Nobel Prize winners. 
 With the creation of the In Company training area at the end of the 90's, IEB's educational offer was significantly expanded. The university affiliations and Spanish and international corporate partners of global importance stand out.

Access and location
The IEB is located in Madrid, a recently declared World Heritage Site, specifically in C. de Alfonso XI, nº 6, Madrid.  
The center is available from Monday to Friday: 9:00 to 14:00 h and 16:00 to 19:30 h. and Saturdays: 8:30 to 14:00 h.

Educational programs
IEB's undergraduate studies are developed in two branches, Law and Business Administration. Two different but complementary worlds: the legal and the economic, which allows double degrees to be completed in 4 years. 

In addition, IEB has a renowned track record, since the first Master in Stock Exchange in 1989, a pioneer in Spain. Since then, IEB has developed an extensive program of Masters in the financial and legal fields. Many of them have regularly obtained top positions in specialized rankings. Today, it is the center of reference in financial training and related areas. 

 Double Bachelor's and Master's degrees
 Postgraduate
 In Company

International alliances
The IEB began its international journey in 2003, with the alliance with the London School of Economics, a world reference institution. Since then, different universities such as Fordham University, The Chinese University of Hong Kong, Wharton University and Bayes Business School have joined this international development. 

 London School of Economics
 Bayes Business School
 The Chinese University of Hong Kong
 Fordham University
 Wharton University

Faculty
IEB's faculty is one of its most distinguishing elements. It is made up of renowned professionals, with extensive teaching experience and who provide a practical point of view of the professional day-to-day. Each of them has been rigorously selected and is subject to a continuous evaluation system.

 Ignacio Gordillo
 Silvia Iranzo
 Mario Weitz
 Otto Granados Roldán

Founding members
 Benito Martínez-Echevarría y Ortega, Founder and First Director
 Antonio Barrera de Irimo, Ex-Deputy Prime Minister of Spain & Ex-Minister of Finance of Spain
 Nicolás Cotoner y Cotoner,  Ex-Head of the Household of King of Spain 
 José Ángel Sánchez Asiaín, Ex-President of BBVA

Some members of the Governing Council
 José Ramón Álvarez Rendueles, Ex-Governor of Bank of Spain & Ex-Sident of Princess of Asturias Foundation 
 Manuel Pizarro Moreno, Ex-President of Endesa & Ex-President of Bolsa de Madrid
 Ángel Corcóstegui, Ex-General Manager of Santander Bank
 José María Michavila, Ex-Justice minister in Spain

History of the association
IEB Alumni was born from the initiative of a group of alumni from different promotions. With the signing of the founding act and the Statutes, the social body of the institution's alumni was constituted as an Association. The protocol of collaboration agreements with IEB, and the official inscription in the Register of Associations on August 5, 2005, culminated the creation of the Association. It is governed by a members Board of Directors representing a diversity of our community and working in the main financial and legal firms.

The Association annually awards two prizes for professional excellence and entrepreneurship which were awarded among others to Victoria Ross, Managing Director Digital Bank BNP Paribas Personal Finance, Laura de Rivera, Director of Regulation and Legal Services at Red Elèctrica Group and Ana Garcia Galloso, CEO of La Champanera.

References

External links
http://www.ieb.es/en/

Business schools in Spain